

Matches
Scores and results list France's points tally first.

Touring party
Manager: J Dunyach
Assistant manager:
Captain: P Saint-Andre

See also
 History of rugby union matches between Argentina and France

References

1996
1996
1996 in Argentine rugby union
1995–96 in French rugby union